Stade Harry Latour is a multi-use stadium in Mahébourg, Grand Port District, Mauritius.  It is currently used mostly for football matches and is the home stadium of Savanne SC.  The stadium holds 2,000 people.

External links
Stadiums in Mauritius at

References

Football venues in Mauritius
Sports venues completed in 2003